Say G&E! is a studio album by American hip hop duo The Grouch & Eligh. It was released on Legendary Music in 2009. It peaked at number 186 on the Billboard 200 chart, as well as number 81 on the Top R&B/Hip-Hop Albums chart, number 5 on the Heatseekers Albums chart, and number 23 on the Independent Albums chart.

Critical reception
Andrew Martin of PopMatters gave the album 8 stars out of 10, describing it as "one of this year's strongest and most balanced hip-hop releases to date." Nate Knaebel of AllMusic said: "The tracks here are infectious and bang as hard as they want to, but they also show an artistry and intelligence you're just not going to get in the mainstream."

Track listing

Personnel 

 Evren Göknar - Mastering Engineer

Charts

References

External links
 

2009 albums
Eligh albums
The Grouch (rapper) albums